Gaul Machlis (21 May 1918 – 19 February 1995) was an Israeli football player and manager. As a player, he played as a forward or attacking midfielder for Maccabi Petah Tikva and Maccabi Tel Aviv at club level, and for Mandatory Palestine internationally.

Club career 
Born in Petah Tikva, Palestine, on 21 May 1918, Machlis began his senior club career at hometown club Maccabi Petah Tikva in 1934, where he won multiple titles, before moving Maccabi Tel Aviv in 1936. In 1945, Machlis was forced to retire early from his playing career due to injury.

Managerial career 
Following his retirement as a player, Machlis was appointed manager of Maccabi Petah Tikva at the end of the 1951–52 season. Before the end of the season, he became manager of Maccabi Tel Aviv, replacing Jerry Beit haLevi. He was dismissed in the middle of the following season.

International career 
Machlis represented Mandatory Palestine internationally three times between 1938 and 1940. He scored one goal in his last cap, in Mandatory Palestine's last international match against Lebanon in 1940.

Personal life 
Machlis died on 19 February 1995 before the age of 77, after suffering from a serious illness.

References

External links

 Gaul Machlis at maccabipedia.co.il
 

1918 births
1995 deaths
Israeli footballers
Jewish Israeli sportspeople
Association football forwards
Association football outside forwards
Association football midfielders
Mandatory Palestine footballers
Mandatory Palestine international footballers
Maccabi Petah Tikva F.C. players
Maccabi Tel Aviv F.C. players
Israeli football managers
Maccabi Petah Tikva F.C. managers
Maccabi Tel Aviv F.C. managers
Footballers from Petah Tikva